The canton of Saint-Ours is an administrative division of the Puy-de-Dôme department, central France. It was created at the French canton reorganisation which came into effect in March 2015. Its seat is in Saint-Ours.

It consists of the following communes:
 
Bourg-Lastic
Briffons
Bromont-Lamothe
La Celle
Chapdes-Beaufort
Charbonnières-les-Varennes
Cisternes-la-Forêt
Combrailles
Condat-en-Combraille
Fernoël
Giat
La Goutelle
Herment
Landogne
Lastic
Messeix
Miremont
Montel-de-Gelat
Montfermy
Pontaumur
Pontgibaud
Prondines
Pulvérières
Puy-Saint-Gulmier
Saint-Avit
Saint-Étienne-des-Champs
Saint-Germain-près-Herment
Saint-Hilaire-les-Monges
Saint-Jacques-d'Ambur
Saint-Julien-Puy-Lavèze
Saint-Ours
Saint-Pierre-le-Chastel
Saint-Sulpice
Sauvagnat
Savennes
Tortebesse
Tralaigues
Verneugheol
Villossanges
Voingt

References

Cantons of Puy-de-Dôme